Spyman is a fictional character, a short-lived comic book superhero published by Harvey Comics' Harvey Thriller imprint in the mid-1960s. He starred in three issues of his own comic, cover-dated September 1966 to February 1967.

Spyman #1 contained the first professional comic book works by Jim Steranko.  Steranko created the concept and plotted the first story. However, he did not supply any artwork, except the first page splash which includes a diagram of his robot hand.  This was one of three concepts Steranko created for Harvey that saw print.

Spyman was secret agent Johnny Chance, who lost his left hand defusing a nuclear bomb.  Johnny was an agent of the American spy group LIBERTY, headquartered under the Statue of Liberty.  After losing his hand, he would be outfitted with an 'Electro Robot Hand', each finger a different tool/weapon.  He would soon be outfitted with a belt with extra fingers with additional uses.

Chance and LIBERTY fought against MIRAGE (Empire of Guerrilla Assassination, Revenge, and International Menace), led by the Whisperer.  Whisperer was killed in the first issue, and Chance would go on to fight Cyclops and the Evil Eye Society in the second issue and the Id Machine in the third.

It is unknown who wrote the stories; it may have been editor Joe Simon.  Pencil art was by George Tuska with inking by Dick Ayers, with some inks by Reed Crandall, in the first issue. Ayers inked the second issue, then Bill Draut the third.

References

External links
Archive of Spyman at SimonComics.com (Joe Simon site). Original page.
Spyman at Don Markstein's Toonopedia
Spyman at International Superheroes
Dial B for Blog on Spyman (included Steranko's original concept sketch)

Harvey Comics titles
Harvey Comics superheroes
1966 comics debuts
1967 comics endings
Comics characters introduced in 1966